There Was Blood Everywhere is a compilation of Embalmer's "There Was Blood Everywhere" EP and four new tracks. It was released by Relapse Records in 1997. The liner notes come with full recording information (including dates and locales) and full lyrics.

Track listing
Music by Embalmer. Copyright Relapse-Release Music.
"There Was Blood Everywhere" – 1:51 
"The Necro-Filing Cabinet" – 2:37
"Blood Sucking Freaks" – 2:09
"May the Wounds Bleed Forever" – 3:27
"Rotten Body Fluids" – 2:37  
"Bone Box" – 4:44  
"Morbid Confessions" – 2:26  
"The Cellar" – 5:06

Personnel
Rick Fleming – vocals
John Jermann – guitar
Mark Davis – guitar
Dave Phillips – bass
Roy Stewart – drums, percussion

Production
Embalmer – arrangement, production, recording, engineering, mixing
Bill Yurkiewicz – production, recording, engineering, mixing

References

Embalmer's "There Was Blood Everywhere" liner notes; 1997 Relapse Records.

Embalmer (band) compilation albums
Relapse Records albums
Albums with cover art by Wes Benscoter
1997 compilation albums